Jez Litten (born ) is a professional rugby league footballer who plays as a  and  for Hull Kingston Rovers in the Super League.

He has played for Hull F.C., and spent time on loan from Hull at Doncaster in Betfred League 1, and at Hull KR during the 2019 Super League season.

Background
Litten was born in Kingston upon Hull, East Riding of Yorkshire, England.

Career
In 2017 he made his Super League début for Hull FC against the Warrington Wolves.

In October 2017 Litten agreed to join Doncaster on loan for the 2018 season.

On 22 April, Litten scored his first Betfred Super League try in his sides 62–16 loss against St Helens.

On 29 July, Litten joined rivals Hull Kingston Rovers from Hull F.C., joining teammate Dean Hadley on a three-year deal with the East Hull outfit.  

Litten made a total of 20 appearances for Hull KR in the 2021 Super League season including the club's 28-10 semi-final loss against the Catalans Dragons which saw Hull KR fall one game short of the grand final.

References

External links
Hull KR profile
Hull FC profile
SL profile
Hull FC talking points: Second-half collapses, Litten shows glimpses and Saturdays popular?

1998 births
Living people
Doncaster R.L.F.C. players
England Knights national rugby league team players
English rugby league players
Hull F.C. players
Hull Kingston Rovers players
Rugby league halfbacks
Rugby league players from Kingston upon Hull